Claudin-9 is a protein that in humans is encoded by the CLDN9 gene. It belongs to the group of claudins.

This gene is expressed in the inner ear, olfactory epithelium, and anterior pituitary gland  and is involved in hearing.

References

External links

Further reading